Papyrius is a genus of ants in the subfamily Dolichoderinae. The genus is known only from Australia and New Guinea, where they nest in dead wood in forested areas.

Species
 Papyrius flavus (Mayr, 1865)
 Papyrius nitidus (Mayr, 1862)

References

External links

Dolichoderinae
Ant genera
Hymenoptera of Australia